Mark Schreiber is an American politician serving as a member of the Kansas House of Representatives from the 60th district. Elected in November 2016, he assumed office on January 9, 2017.

Education 
Schreiber earned a Bachelor of Science degree and Master of Science degree in biology from Emporia State University.

Career 
As a graduate student, Schreiber worked as a biologist at the Wolf Creek Generating Station. From 1979 to 2017, Schreiber worked for Westar Energy, retiring as the company's vice president for government affairs. In his role, Schreiber was tasked with lobbying members of the Kansas Legislature. Schreiber was elected to the Kansas House of Representatives in November 2016 and assumed office on January 9, 2017. Since 2019, he has also served as vice chair of the House Energy, Utilities, and Telecommunications Committee.

References 

Living people
Republican Party members of the Kansas House of Representatives
Emporia State University alumni
Year of birth missing (living people)